Pellaina Kothalo is a 2006 Indian Telugu-language romance film, produced and directed by Madan on Aa Naluguru Films banner. The film stars Jagapati Babu, Priyamani, and music composed by Agastya.

Plot
The film begins with two software engineers Veeramachineni Harikrishna & Lakshmi who are pantophobia and testy. Moreover, the two are consistently reliant on their besties Bhagawan & Janaki. A dominating wife & husband invariably suppress their spouse Satyabhama & Chalapati respectively. Hari & Lakshmi are formally arranged by elders to meet (Pelli Choopulu). Whereupon, they like each and knitted. Soon after, the pair adjudicate for a warm climate around them. But their trains indoctrinate their mindset in the name of ascendancy and personal freedom. Additionally, it offers advice that the first night is the right time to keep the partner under the toe. 

Beginning with Hari & Lakshmi's attempt to wield others and waiting for a spot opposite to blink, they never consummated. Once, Lakshmi's old mate Prakash arrives when to arouse her husband Lakshmi pretends closeness to him. Fortuitously, his wife Astha is Hari's previous salsa tutor one has an infatuation with him. So, he also repeats the same which enrages their ego, and silly squabbles launch. Eventually, the couple overboard on their mates which hit rock bottom and they settle to spilt. Simultaneously, Hari's grandparents' land from their village who are unbeknownst to the state of play. Hence, Hari & Lakshmi enacts affinity to gratify them. Plus, the elders invite the twosome to the village to conduct a heritage ritual 'Dampatya Vratam''. 

Accordingly, they proceed and start the ritual. As a result, intimacy, and geniality emerge between the couple. Parallelly, Bhagawan & Janaki are aware that it is just their consort's virtue to be surrendering to them and transform. Besides, Hari & Lakshmi discovers the entire ritual is fake, forged by old men, and freaks out. At that point, the oldies affirm that being conscious of their marital life they made this play. Thus, to impress upon them that nuptial is neither agreement nor adjustment it is holy bondage. Listening to it, soul-searching starts inside the duet who realizes the eminence of marriage and the importance of the better half. Finally, the movie ends happily with the first night of Hari & Lakshmi.

Cast

 Jagapati Babu as Veeramachineni Harikrishna "Hari"
 Priyamani as Lakshmi "Lucky"
 Astha Singhal as Astha "Chintu"
 Raju Sundaram as Prakash
 Kota Srinivasa Rao as Veeraraju, Hari's grandfather
 Brahmanandam
 Sunil as Chalapathi
 Ali as Ali
 Dharmavarapu Subramanyam as Priest
 M. S. Narayana as Lakshmi's uncle
 Venu Madhav as Venu Madhav
 Giribabu
 Ahuti Prasad as Hari's father
 Krishna Bhagawan as Bhagawan
 Shankar Melkote as Ali's boss
 Madhu
 Geetanjali as Hari's grandmother
 Kovai Sarala
 Jhansi as Janaki
 Hema as Satya Bhama
 Gundu Sudarshan as Traffic Police Officer
 Rajitha as Lakshmi's aunt
 Madhumani
 Devisri
 Sushma
 Waheeda Rehman as a servant at Hari's grandfather's house

Soundtrack

Music composed by Agashtya. Music released on ADITYA Music Company.

Reception 
Jeevi of idlebrain.com wrote that the film "showcases Jagapati Babu’s brilliance as an actor all over again".

References

External links
 

2006 films
Indian romantic comedy films
2006 romantic comedy films
Films set in Mumbai
Films shot in Hyderabad, India
Films set in Hyderabad, India
2000s Telugu-language films